Angelle Sampey (born Angelle Monique Sampey, August 7, 1970, New Orleans, Louisiana) is an American Pro Stock Motorcycle racer. She won the NHRA Pro Stock Motorcycle championship three times (2000-2002). Since her debut in 1996, she has earned an all-time class record 45 top-qualifier awards and 46 event victories, the most wins for any female in both NHRA competition and professional motor sports as a whole. On June 23, 2007 at Old Bridge Township Raceway Park in Englishtown, New Jersey, she scored her 42nd career pole position and more importantly set the national Pro Stock Motorcycle elapsed time record with a 6.871 second run. Following her April 1, 2007 win in Houston, Texas, Sampey was just 5 wins away from setting the all-time Pro Stock Motorcycle wins record, currently held by Dave Schultz. Sampey also holds the active record of 182 consecutive races without a Did Not Qualify, dating all the way back to her professional debut.  She also holds the mark of 364 round wins in 506 competitive rounds, which calculates to a 71.9% win-per-round ratio.

Sampey raced a Suzuki from 1996 through 2007, sponsored most notably by R.J. Reynolds' Winston brand and the U.S. Army.

Due to lack of sponsorship, Sampey did not race during the 2009 season, breaking her string of event qualifications.

On 11 March 2010, Sampey announced her retirement as a professional drag racer.

Along with Erica Enders-Stevens, Shirley Muldowney, Brittany Force, and Christina Nielsen, Sampey is one of a very few women to have won a major motorsports championship title; she, Enders-Stevens and Muldowney are the only female drag racers to have scored more than ten NHRA event wins, as well as the only three women in the sport to win more than one championship in their respective divisions, Muldowney with three in Top Fuel, Enders-Stevens with three in Pro Stock and Sampey with three in Pro Stock Motorcycle. Angelle is considered the winningest female in professional motorsports history with 41 career wins.

Sampey also raced under her married names Angelle Seeling and Angelle Savoie.

On 13 September 2014, it was announced that Sampey would return before the end of the 2014 NHRA season, and will compete for the championship in 2015.

References

Gallery

External links
 Business Owner

1970 births
Living people
American motorcycle racers
Motorcycle drag racers
Female motorcycle racers
Female dragster drivers
Sportspeople from New Orleans
Racing drivers from Louisiana
American female racing drivers
21st-century American women